The 2013 British motorcycle Grand Prix was the twelfth round of the 2013 MotoGP season. It was held at the Silverstone Circuit in Silverstone on 1 September 2013.

Classification

MotoGP

Moto2

Moto3

Championship standings after the race (MotoGP)
Below are the standings for the top five riders and constructors after round twelve has concluded.

Riders' Championship standings

Constructors' Championship standings

 Note: Only the top five positions are included for both sets of standings.

References

British motorcycle Grand Prix
British
Motorcycle Grand Prix
British motorcycle Grand Prix